The Wilson House is a historic house at 214 East 5th Street in Russellville, Arkansas.  It is a two-story brick building with a hip roof, and tall two-story projecting gabled entry pavilion, supported by massive Doric columns.  A two-story porch, open on the second level, wraps across the front and around the left side. Built in 1903 by a local judge, it was from an early date a local tourist attraction for its distinctive appearance.

The house was listed on the National Register of Historic Places in 1978.

See also
National Register of Historic Places listings in Pope County, Arkansas

References

Houses on the National Register of Historic Places in Arkansas
National Register of Historic Places in Pope County, Arkansas
Houses completed in 1903
Houses in Pope County, Arkansas
Buildings and structures in Russellville, Arkansas
1907 establishments in Arkansas